Triumph Daytona is a model designation used for various motorcycles of British motorcycle manufacturer Triumph Motorcycles.
Triumph Daytona 500, 1966–1970
Triumph Daytona 600, 2002–2004
Triumph Daytona 650, 2005
Triumph Daytona 675, 2006-2017
Triumph Daytona 750, 1991–1994
Triumph Daytona Moto2 765, 2019-2022
Triumph Daytona 900, 1993–1996
Triumph Daytona 955i, 1997–2006
Triumph Daytona 1000, 1992–1993
Triumph Daytona 1200, 1993–1997
Triumph Tiger Daytona, 1967–1974